Flatbush Town Hall at 35 Snyder Avenue between Flatbush and Bedford Avenues in the Flatbush neighborhood of Brooklyn, New York City, is a historic town hall built in 1874–75 and designed by John Y. Culyer in the High Victorian Gothic style in the Ruskinian mode. It is a two-story masonry building on a stone foundation, and features a three-story bell tower with a steep hip roof. The building dates from the time before the Town of Flatbush was integrated into the City of Brooklyn, in 1894, after which the building served as a magistrate's court and the New York City Police Department's 67th Police Precinct station.

Due to the efforts of the Town of Flatbush Civic and Cultural Association and the Flatbush Historical Society, the building was saved from a planned demolition, and was designated a New York City Landmark in 1966, and was listed on the National Register of Historic Places in 1972. In the late 1980s it underwent a redesign and refurbishment by the New York City Department of Administrative Services, and it is now used as a public school focused on the needs of special education children.

See also
List of New York City Landmarks
National Register of Historic Places listings in Kings County, New York

References
Notes

External links

Government buildings on the National Register of Historic Places in New York City
Government buildings in Brooklyn
Gothic Revival architecture in New York City
Government buildings completed in 1875
New York City Designated Landmarks in Brooklyn
National Register of Historic Places in Brooklyn
City and town halls on the National Register of Historic Places in New York (state)
Flatbush, Brooklyn
1875 establishments in New York (state)